Three Legged Dog is the fourth studio album by Australian indie rock band The Cruel Sea. The album was released in April 1995 and peaked at number 1 on the ARIA Charts. The liner notes of the album lists “For Pandora”, Gormly’s daughter, pictured in the liner notes.

At the ARIA Music Awards of 1995, the album was nominated for four awards; winning the ARIA Award for Best Group, Engineer of the Year for Tony Cohen and Paul McKercher's work, and Producer of the Year for Cohen's work.

Composition
Three Legged Dog was the first Cruel Sea album with writing contributions from all members of the band. Previously, most songs has originated from home demos recorded by Danny Rumour. Perkins said, "We have been playing together for so many years getting to know each other that creating music as a unit was a natural progression. It was a fresh way of doing things and made the creative process exciting again."

Cover
The cover photo was taken by Kristyna Higgins, Perkins' partner. The dog, Molly, was owned by a friend of the band. Cruickshank said, "The most beautiful creature you've ever seen. She's a very proud creature, and looks the wiser for not having her other leg.

Reception
The Sydney Morning Herald said, "The album marks a significant departure from the pop-inspired hooks and punchlines pf The Honeymoon is Over, getting back to the harder-edged groove and rock sensibilities found on their earlier albums.

Track listing

Charts

Weekly charts

Year-end charts

Release history

See also
 List of number-one albums in Australia during the 1990s

References

1995 albums
The Cruel Sea (band) albums
Albums produced by Tony Cohen
ARIA Award-winning albums